Nostromo Defensa is a defense contractor based in Córdoba, Argentina. It has been working since 2006 in developing unmanned aerial vehicles for military and non-military use. The company's CEO is Marcelo Martínez.

The Yarará project for the Argentine Air Force (Fuerza Aérea Argentina, FAA) was developed by this company. The company developed and manufactured the Centinela helicopter.

List of aircraft 
Several of the models listed below are (or were) manufactured in several variants:
 Nostromo Caburé
 Nostromo Centinela
 Nostromo Yaguá
 Nostromo Yarará

See also 
 AeroDreams
 Quimar

References

External links 
 Аргентинские беспилотники на мировом рынке

Defense companies of Argentina
Aircraft manufacturers of Argentina
Unmanned aerial vehicle manufacturers
Manufacturing companies established in 2006
2006 establishments in Argentina